George Ekeh (born 10 July 1980 in Festac Town, Lagos State, Nigeria) is a Nigerian-Swedish former footballer.

Career

India
He scored hat tricks twice for Mohun Bagan, scoring all his team's goals in a 3-3 draw with JCT in 2002 and a 3-1 victory over defending champion HAL in 2003. In September 2003, however, he complained that Mohun Bagan had not paid him the amount they owed him, taking the case to FIFA, which ordered the Mariners to pay the Nigerian the $6500 he was due.

In 2007, he played as a forward for Churchill Brothers S.C.

Finland

He topped the scoring charts of the 2010 Kakkonen with Atlantis by May 2010, scoring nine goals.

Personal life
He is the brother of Emmanuel and Charles Ekeh Kingsley Ekeh.He is also uncle to Ekeh Manuchimso.

References

External links 
 at ZeroZero
 at Soccerway

Association football forwards
Living people
Expatriate footballers in Tunisia
Expatriate footballers in Sweden
George Ekeh
Sportspeople from Lagos
Nigerian footballers
Stade Tunisien players
Atlantis FC players
Swedish footballers
Arameisk-Syrianska IF players
Gröndals IK players
Mohun Bagan AC players
Swedish people of Nigerian descent
1980 births
Expatriate footballers in Finland
Expatriate footballers in Thailand
Expatriate footballers in India
George Ekeh
Nigerian expatriate footballers
Churchill Brothers FC Goa players
Ljungskile SK players
Trelleborgs FF players